Basir Çollaku is an Albanian journalist and head of the Albanian Telegraphic Agency in Albania. Collaku usually publish his personal opinion in Rilindja Demokratike.

References

Year of birth missing (living people)
Place of birth missing (living people)
20th-century births
20th-century Albanian writers
21st-century Albanian writers
Albanian journalists
Living people